Simon Proulx-Sénécal (born December 6, 1991) is a Canadian-born ice dancer who competes with Tina Garabedian for Armenia. They are the 2015 Golden Spin of Zagreb bronze medalists and reached the free dance at two European Championships (2016, 2017).

Personal life 
Simon Proulx-Sénécal was born on December 6, 1991 in LaSalle, Quebec, Canada. Proulx-Sénécal came out as gay.

Career

Early years 
Proulx-Sénécal switched from ice hockey to figure skating when he was seven years old and teamed up with his first partner at age twelve. Competing with Josyane Cholette, he placed 11th in junior ice dancing at both the 2011 and 2012 Canadian Championships. He and Christina Penkov were 15th on the junior level at the 2013 Canadian Championships. During the next two seasons, he competed with Mélissande Dumas on the senior level. They finished 11th at the 2014 Canadian Championships and 12th in 2015.

Partnership with Garabedian 
In May 2015, Proulx-Sénécal teamed up with Tina Garabedian to compete for Armenia. Making their international debut, they placed sixth at the 2015 Ice Challenge, a 2015–16 ISU Challenger Series (CS) event held in October in Graz, Austria. In December, they won their first CS medal – bronze at the 2015 Golden Spin of Zagreb.

In January 2016, Garabedian/Proulx-Sénécal were one of twenty teams to qualify for the final segment at the European Championships in Bratislava, Slovakia, having ranked 20th in the short dance. They finished 18th overall after placing 18th in the free dance.

Programs 
(with Garabedian)

Competitive highlights 
GP: Grand Prix; CS: Challenger Series

With Garabedian for Armenia

Earlier partnerships

References

External links 

 

1991 births
Living people
People from LaSalle, Quebec
Figure skaters from Montreal
Armenian male ice dancers
Canadian male ice dancers
Canadian LGBT sportspeople
LGBT figure skaters
Gay sportsmen
Olympic figure skaters of Armenia
Figure skaters at the 2022 Winter Olympics
Canadian gay men